Franklin Phillip "Frank" Kerns (May 21, 1933 – August 3, 2015) was an American basketball coach. He coached Georgia Southern from 1981 to 1994.

A native of Cumberland, Maryland, Kerns served in the Marine Corps during the Korean War. He later earned a degree in physical education from the University of Alabama. Kerns served as coach of Georgia Southern from 1982 to 1994, compiling a record of 244–132. A four-time Trans America Athletic Conference Coach of the Year, Kerns coached the Eagles to NCAA Tournaments in 1983, 1987, and 1992. The Eagles also reached the National Invitation Tournament in 1988 and 1989 under the direction of Kerns. He later coached in China for a year and in Austria for six years. He then coached at Bulloch Academy for several years. Kerns was color analyst for Georgia Southern Radio for eight years.

Kerns died on August 3, 2015 at East Georgia Regional Medical Center in Statesboro, Georgia. He was 82 years old and had a brief illness. He was buried on August 6, 2015.

Head coaching record

NAIA

NCAA

References

1933 births
2015 deaths
American men's basketball coaches
Basketball coaches from Georgia (U.S. state)
College men's basketball head coaches in the United States
Georgia Southern Eagles men's basketball coaches
People from Statesboro, Georgia
University of Alabama alumni
Military personnel from Cumberland, Maryland
Sportspeople from Cumberland, Maryland